The Gamers' Choice Awards was an award show that honored the video game industry in 2018. It was held on December 3, 2018 and broadcast on December 9, 2018 on CBS. It was the first gaming and Esports awards show to be televised on a broadcast network.

Event 
The idea for the show came from Michael Burg, executive producer for the Teen Choice Awards. Victor Borachuk along with his company JupiterReturn, left the project prior to the show's airing.

The awards were based on fan voting and online public voting was held beginning November 17, 2018 to decide the winners. Two previews shows were held on November 17 and November 18, 2018 and aired on CBS. The initial shows were nomination shows prior to the main show on December 9.

The award show was held on December 3, 2018 at The Fonda Theatre in Hollywood, California. KISS performed followed by a tribute to Stan Lee. The competition featured 150 nominees in 22 categories.

The show premiered on CBS on December 9, 2018. Winners included Ninja who was awarded Fan Favorite Esports Player of the Year, Fan Favorite Gamer Moment, and the 2018 Super Nova Honor. Other winners included TimTheTatman and Pokimane who were named Streamers of the Year. Fortnite led the award shows with five fan favorite awards. Additional winners included Terry Crews for Fan Favorite Celebrity Gamer and Snoop Dogg for Fan Favorite Music Artist Gamer.

Winners and nominees

Video games 
Titles in bold won in their respective category.

Esports and celebrities

Other

Notes

References 

2018 awards in the United States
2018 in video gaming
Video game awards
December 2018 events in the United States
2018 in Los Angeles